Dimitar Todorov (born 8 November 1996) is a Bulgarian footballer who plays as a defender.

Career
On 27 May 2015, Todorov made his professional debut for his hometown club Slavia Sofia in a 1–0 away win against Haskovo, coming on as substitute for Yanis Karabelyov. In the summer of 2015 he moved to Ludogorets Razgrad II but was released in 6 months.  In January 2016, Todorov joined Lokomotiv Sofia. On 17 February 2017, he returned to Slavia Sofia.

In July 2017, Todorov signed with Botev Vratsa.

In February 2018, Todorov joined Neftochimic.  He left the club at the end of the season.

References

External links

Living people
1996 births
Footballers from Sofia
Bulgarian footballers
Association football defenders
First Professional Football League (Bulgaria) players
Second Professional Football League (Bulgaria) players
PFC Slavia Sofia players
FC Lokomotiv 1929 Sofia players
FC Botev Vratsa players
Neftochimic Burgas players